Pterachaenia is a genus of flowering plants in the tribe Cichorieae within the family Asteraceae.

Species
There is only one known species, Pterachaenia stewartii , native to Afghanistan and Pakistan.

References

Monotypic Asteraceae genera
Cichorieae
Flora of Pakistan
Flora of Afghanistan